The National Provincial Championship, or NPC, was the predecessor to the current Air New Zealand Cup and Heartland Championship in New Zealand rugby. 2004 was the 29th year of the National Provincial Championship, Canterbury were the winners of Division 1, Nelson Bays were the winners of Division 2, while Poverty Bay were the winners of Division 3.

Standings

Division 1 Standings

Division 2 Standings

 
 =  lost five points and  lost one bonus point for player eligibility breaches i.e. the points gained in the match of the breach.

Division 3 Standings

2004 results

Division One

Week 1

Week 2

Week 3

Week 4

Week 5

Week 6

Week 7

Week 8

Week 9

Semi-finals

2004 Division One Grand Final

Ranfurly Shield

As the holders of the Ranfurly Shield from the end of 2003, Auckland were the Ranfurly Shield holders in 2004 and started with its first defence against Poverty Bay in Auckland. Auckland won this match and defended it successfully once and lost its third defence of the season to Bay of Plenty. With the unions first ever Ranfurly Shield win, Bay of Plenty won its first ever defence of the shield before losing it to Canterbury who successfully defeated its following challengers to keep the shield for the summer of 2004 and into the 2005 season.

Auckland (15th Ranfurly Shield reign)
 July 28, 2004 - Auckland v Poverty Bay (won 116-3)
 August 1, 2004 - Auckland v Counties Manukau (won 100-15)
 August 15, 2004 - Auckland v Bay of Plenty (lost 28-33)

Bay of Plenty (1st Ranfurly Shield reign)
 August 22, 2004 - Bay of Plenty v Waikato (won 26-20)
 September 5, 2004 - Bay of Plenty v Canterbury (lost 26-33)

Canterbury (11th Ranfurly Shield reign)
 September 18, 2004 - Canterbury v Southland (won 52-13)
 October 9, 2004 - Canterbury v Northland (won 68-19)

References
 thesilverfern.co.nz(  2009-08-01)
 The 2005 New Zealand Rugby Almanack, Edited by Clive Akers and Geoff Miller

National Provincial Championship
2
National